The episodes of the Tokyo Mew Mew New anime series are based on the manga series of the same name written by Reiko Yoshida and illustrated by Mia Ikumi. The episodes focus on five girls infused with the DNA of rare animals that gives them special powers and allows them to transform into "Mew Mews". Led by Ichigo Momomiya, the girls protect Earth from aliens who wish to "reclaim" it. It is a reboot/remake of the original series.

A new anime adaptation was announced to commemorate the manga's 20th anniversary. It was later revealed that the adaptation would be animated by Yumeta Company and Graphinica, and directed by Takahiro Natori, with Yuka Yamada handling the series' scripts, Satoshi Ishino designing the characters, and Yasuharu Takanashi composing the music. New cast members were chosen to play the Mew Mews through a public audition held in Q2 2020, and they would also be promoting as an idol group named Smewthie as their characters.

The first season from new series aired from July 6 to September 21, 2022, on TV Tokyo. A second season was announced at the end of the twelfth episode. It is set to premiere in April 2023.

Sentai Filmworks has licensed the series outside of Asia and streams it on HIDIVE.



Episode list

Season 1 (2022)

Notes

See also 

 List of Tokyo Mew Mew chapters
 List of Tokyo Mew Mew characters
 List of Tokyo Mew Mew episodes

References 

Tokyo Mew Mew New